The Electronic Journal of Linear Algebra is a peer-reviewed platinum open access scientific journal covering matrix analysis and linear algebra, together with their applications. It is published by the International Linear Algebra Society and its editor-in-chief is Froilán M. Dopico (University Carlos III of Madrid).

Editors-in-chief
The first editors-in-chief were Volker Mehrmann (Technical University of Berlin; 1996–1999) and Daniel Hershkowitz (Bar-Ilan University; 1996–2010). The current editor-in-chief is Froilán M. Dopico (Universidad Carlos III de Madrid; since 2019).

Abstracting and indexing
The journal is abstracted and indexed in:
 Current Contents/Physical, Chemical & Earth Sciences
 Mathematical Reviews
 Science Citation Index Expanded
 Scopus
 Zentralblatt MATH
According to the Journal Citation Reports, the journal has a 2020 impact factor of 0.682.

References

External links

Mathematics journals
English-language journals
Open access journals
Publications established in 1996
Annual journals
Online-only journals